Tanemura (written: 種村 lit. "seed/kind/species, village") is a Japanese surname. Notable people with the surname include:

, Japanese manga artist
, Japanese writer, critic and essayist
, Japanese translator, critic and essayist

Japanese-language surnames